Franklin Roosevelt Bueres Junior, commonly known as Franklin (born 18 May 1971), is a Brazilian futsal player who plays for Corinthians and the Brazilian national futsal team.

References

External links
FIFA profile
Futsalplanet profile

1971 births
Living people
Futsal goalkeepers
Brazilian men's futsal players
People from Osasco
FS Cartagena players
Footballers from São Paulo (state)